Rashid Zia (born 6 April 1974) is a Pakistani-born American cricketer. Rashid Zia first played for the United States in representative cricket in the 2001 ICC Trophy, and later was part of the team that played America's first two One Day Internationals in the 2004 ICC Champions Trophy in England. Like the rest of the players in the American side, which was beaten heavily by New Zealand and then Australia, Rashid Zia was one of only two players that were possibly the only hope for the team.

External links 

1974 births
Living people
United States One Day International cricketers
Pakistani emigrants to the United States
Cricketers from Gujranwala
American cricketers
American sportspeople of Pakistani descent